Surf Ride is an album by saxophonist Art Pepper featuring sessions from 1952-54 which was originally released as a 12 inch LP on the Savoy label in 1956.

Reception

The AllMusic review by Scott Yanow observed: "The music on this Savoy LP is quite brilliant, but the packaging leaves something to be desired ... The somewhat random nature of this set is unfortunate, for Pepper is in superior form throughout".

Track listing 
All compositions by Art Pepper, except where indicated.
 "Tickle Toe" (Lester Young) - 2:55
 "Chili Pepper" - 3:00
 "Susie the Poodle" - 3:14
 "Brown Gold" - 2:26
 "Holiday Flight" - 3:12
 "Surf Ride" - 2:54
 "Straight Life" - 2:52
 "Cinnamon" - 3:11
 "Thyme Time" - 3:30
 "The Way You Look Tonight" (Dorothy Fields, Jerome Kern) - 3:48
 "Nutmeg" - 3:15
 "Art's Oregano" - 3:08 
Recorded in Los Angeles, CA on March 4, 1952 (tracks 4-6), March 29, 1953 (tracks 1-3) and August 25, 1954 (tracks 7-12)

Personnel 
Art Pepper - alto saxophone
Jack Montrose - tenor saxophone (tracks 7-12)
Russ Freeman (tracks 1-3), Hampton Hawes (tracks 4-6), Claude Williamson  (tracks 7-12) - piano
Monty Budwig (tracks 7-12), Joe Mondragon (tracks 4-6), Bob Whitlock (tracks 1-3) - bass 
Larry Bunker (tracks 4-12), Bobby White (tracks 1-3) - drums

References 

1956 albums
Art Pepper albums
Savoy Records albums
Albums produced by Ozzie Cadena